The Yankin Children's Hospital is a major public hospital in Yangon, Myanmar. The hospital established in 2011 with a capacity of 550 beds.

See also
 List of hospitals in Yangon

References

Hospital buildings completed in 1960
Hospitals in Yangon
Hospitals established in 1960